That Certain Thing is the third album by guitarist Snowy White, released in 1987. It was the last album before White's change of direction towards blues music with the Snowy White Blues Agency. CD releases in 1997, 2002 and 2005 featured a different track list with two extra tracks.

The song "For You" had previously been released as a single in 1985 on R4 Records, with the non-album track "Straight On Ahead" on the B-side. "I'll Be Holding On" featured as an additional track on the 12-inch single. The song was a minor hit, reaching No. 65 in the UK. "For You" was released as a single again in 1987, this time on Legend Records, with "Sky High" on the B-side, again a non-album track.

Another single was issued by Legend Records in 1987, with two non-album tracks, "I Can't Let Go" / "Rush Hour". The 12-inch release also featured an instrumental version of "I Can't Let Go", and another track, "Changing Ways".

Track listing

The track "For You" is credited to White, Polehill on some releases.

Personnel
Snowy White – guitars, vocals
Kuma Harada – bass guitar
Godfrey Wang – keyboards
Max Middleton – keyboards
Steve Gregory – flute, saxophone
Richard Bailey – drums, percussion
Sonia Morgan – backing vocals
Tessa Niles – backing vocals
Linda Taylor – backing vocals
Producers – Snowy White, Kuma Harada

References

Snowy White albums
1987 albums